Makkers Staakt uw Wild Geraas is a 1960 Dutch drama film directed by Fons Rademakers. It was entered into the 11th Berlin International Film Festival, where it won the Silver Bear Award.

Plot
The film centers around three families celebrating Sinterklaas in Amsterdam. The first one is a couple who just divorced. The second one is a family who has a teenage son going through puberty and who badly reacts to everything. In the third family they have problems celebrating the feast inside their own home.

Cast
 Ellen Vogel as Norah Leegher-Buwalda
 Guus Hermus as De heer Leegher
 Ank van der Moer as Mevrouw Keizer
 Jan Teulings as De heer Keizer
 Yoka Berretty as Mevrouw Lomijn
 Guus Oster as De heer Lomijn
 Mieke Verstraete as Emma
 Ina van Faassen
 Manfred de Graaf
 Ton van Duinhoven
 Leontine Van Strein

References

External links

1960 films
1960s Dutch-language films
1960 drama films
Dutch drama films
Dutch black-and-white films
Sinterklaas films
Films shot in Amsterdam
Films set in Amsterdam
Films directed by Fons Rademakers